Arnold (Arnie) H. Fisher (born 1938) is an American professional bridge player, bridge author, university instructor and businessman. He is from Clementon, New Jersey and graduated from University of Pennsylvania.

Bridge accomplishments

Wins

 North American Bridge Championships (7)
 Truscott Senior Swiss Teams (3) 1998, 2001, 2003 
 Senior Knockout Teams (3) 1998, 2001, 2002 
 Keohane North American Swiss Teams (1) 1996

Runners-up

 North American Bridge Championships
 Rockwell Mixed Pairs (1) 1996 
 Truscott Senior Swiss Teams (1) 2002 
 Senior Knockout Teams (3) 1997, 2006, 2009

Notes

External links
 

Living people
American contract bridge players
Place of birth missing (living people)
1938 births
Date of birth missing (living people)
People from Clementon, New Jersey
University of Pennsylvania alumni